Beit Nayim (Alternative spelling: Beit Nayem, Beit Na'em, Beit Naem),  is a Syrian village located in Markaz Rif Dimashq, Rif Dimashq. According to the Syria Central Bureau of Statistics (CBS), Beit Nayim had a population of 2,853 in the 2004 census.

References 

Populated places in Markaz Rif Dimashq District